Anže Šetina (born May 9, 1986 in Kranj) is a Slovenian skeleton racer who has competed since 2006. His best World Cup finish was 15th in Igls in January 2010.

Šetina competed at the 2010 Winter Olympics where he finished 21st.

External links
 
 
 

1986 births
Living people
Olympic skeleton racers of Slovenia
Sportspeople from Kranj
Slovenian male skeleton racers
Skeleton racers at the 2010 Winter Olympics